Mitsubishi Motors Philippines Corporation (MMPC) (formerly Philippine Automotive Manufacturing Corporation) is the Philippine operation of Mitsubishi Motors Corporation (MMC), where it is the second-biggest seller of automobiles. MMPC is one of MMC's four manufacturing facilities outside Japan, and currently produces the Mitsubishi Mirage, 
Mirage G4, and the L300. From 1987 to 2018, MMPC was the distributor of Mitsubishi Fuso commercial vehicles in the Philippines until Sojitz Fuso Philippines Corporation was established in September 2018. The company's slogan is "Drive your Ambition", which has been part of Mitsubishi Motors' global rebranding since 2018.

The company was incorporated in 1987 as Philippine Automotive Manufacturing Corporation (PAMCOR) and was renamed Mitsubishi Motors Philippines Corporation (MMPC) in 1996.

History

The company's predecessor, Canlubang Automotive Resources Corporation (CARCO), was originally established as Chrysler Philippines Corporation in 1963 as the assembler and distributor of Chrysler, Dodge and Plymouth cars in the Philippines. In May 1972, C. J. Yulo & Sons acquired 65% interest in Chrysler Philippines Corporation, with the balance 35% being acquired by Mitsubishi Motors Corporation (MMC) and Nissho Iwai Corporation (now Sojitz Corporation). In 1974, the company introduced Mitsubishi cars in the Philippines. In 1978, the company was renamed Canlubang Automotive Resources Corporation (CARCO). In 1985, MMC and Nissho Iwai Corporation (now known as Sojitz Corporation) acquired full ownership of CARCO from the Yulo group.

In January 1987, Philippine Automotive Manufacturing Corporation (PAMCOR) was incorporated by MMC and Nissho Iwai to formally take over the operations and business activities of CARCO. In April 1996, MMC became the majority shareholder (51%) of PAMCOR after it acquired 1% of Nissho Iwai's share in the company. In August 1996, PAMCOR was renamed Mitsubishi Motors Philippines Corporation (MMPC).

On June 1, 2018, Sojitz Corporation (formerly Nissho Iwai Corporation) completed its divestment from MMPC with the acquisition of its 49% stake in MMPC by MMC. As a result, MMPC becomes a 100% wholly owned subsidiary of MMC.

On November 22, 2018, Mitsubishi Fuso Truck and Bus Corporation announced that Sojitz Fuso Philippines Corporation would take over from MMPC as the general distributor of Fuso products in the Philippines effective the first quarter of 2019.

In July 2020, the company produced the 200,000th unit of their best-selling L300 truck, and it will be exported to other Southeast Asian countries, particularly in Indonesia, starting in 2022.

Asian Transmission Corporation 
MMPC owns a subsidiary, Asian Transmission Corp. (ATC), located in Calamba, Laguna since its establishment in 1973, which produces auto components. Asian Transmission Corporation was sold to Mitsubishi Motors of Japan from MMPC.

Real estate venture 
Mitsubishi Motors Properties, Mitsubishi Motors Philippines' property development and real estate arm, the company develops large-scale, mixed-use, planned communities incorporating residential, commercial, educational, and leisure components. It provides other services such as project design, construction oversight, and property management.

Divisions and subsidiaries
 Asian Transmission Corporation (ATC)
 Mitsubishi Motors Properties, Inc. (MMPI)

Production and sales

(sources: Facts & Figures 2005, Facts & Figures 2008, Mitsubishi Motors website)

Vehicles

Current products

Chassis Cab

Cars

Pickup trucks and SUVs

MPVs

Electric Vehicles 

* – Manufactured locally

Former products 
 ASX (2011–2018) - Imported from Japan
 Adventure (1997–2017) - Locally Produced
 Eclipse (1998–2011) - Imported from Japan
Endeavor (2007–2011) - Locally Produced
 Fuzion (2007–2016) - Locally Produced
 Galant (1988–2012) - Locally Produced
 Grandis (2005–2011) - Imported from Japan 
 Lancer (1976–2011) - Locally Produced
 Lancer EX (2008–2017) - Imported from Japan
 Lancer Evolution (2005–2015) - Imported from Japan
 L300 FB Deluxe (1987–2017) - Locally Produced
 L300 Versa Van (1983–2012) - Locally Produced
 L300 Exceed Van (1997–2005) - Locally Produced
 Outlander (2003–2010) - Imported from Japan
 Pajero (1986–2021) - Imported from Japan and Locally Produced
 Space Gear (1998–2008) - Locally Produced
 Space Wagon (1992–1999) - Locally Produced

Fuso commercial vehicles (transferred to Sojitz Fuso Philippines) 
 Fuso Canter
 Mitsubishi Fuso FK/FL/FM
 Fuso FI
 Fuso FJ
 Rosa
 Fuso FP/FV

All Mitsubishi Fuso products was transferred to the newly formed Sojitz Fuso Philippines Corporation, the general distributor of Fuso commercial vehicles in the Philippines.

References

External links
Mitsubishi Motors Philippines Corporation

Mitsubishi Motors factories
Mitsubishi Motors subsidiaries
Motor vehicle assembly plants in the Philippines
Companies based in Santa Rosa, Laguna
Philippine subsidiaries of foreign companies
Philippine companies established in 1963
Vehicle manufacturing companies established in 1963